The 2nd European Badminton Championships were held in Port Talbot (Wales), between 17  and 19 April 1970, and hosted by the European Badminton Union and the Welsh Badminton Union.

Medalists

Semifinals 
An overview of most of the semifinal results.

Finals

Medal account

References

Results at BE

European Badminton Championships
European Badminton Championships
Bad 
Badminton tournaments in Wales
International sports competitions hosted by Wales
European Badminton Championships